Typhoon Marie, as known as the Tōya Maru Typhoon (洞爺丸台風) in Japan, was a typhoon that hit Japan in September 1954. Marie did a great deal of damage to Hokkaido, and the Tōya Maru (洞爺丸) train ferry sank due to the high waves and windstorm caused by Marie. Because of it, JMA in Japan named the storm Tōya Maru Typhoon.

Overview 

In September 26, Typhoon Marie hit Japan. After passing Kyushu and Chugoku, Marie proceeded Sea of Japan northeast at a tremendous speed and hit Hokkaido.

Due to Marie, some Seikan ferries such as Tōya Maru that departed from Hakodate Port, suffered a gale and high waves. Tōya Maru sank, causing 1,139 people on it to die, resulting in enormous damage. 

Also, a large fire broke out in Iwanai, Hokkaido, partly due to the effect of Marie. This fire called Fire of Iwanai (岩内大火) in Japan.

Name 
JMA named Marie, which caused major damage mainly in Hokkaido, as Tōya Maru Typhoon, honouring the dead of the Tōya Maru.

See also 
 Tōya Maru

References

External links 
 洞爺丸台風 – JMA
 洞爺丸台風 – コトバンク

History of Hokkaido
1954 Pacific typhoon season
1954 in Japan
Typhoons in Japan